The 2nd Grand Prix de Sables d'Olonne was a Formula Two motor race held on 13 July 1952 at Les Sables-d'Olonne, in Pays de la Loire, France. It was round 6 of Les Grands Prix de France Formula Two Championship. Race distance was decided not by distance but by time, the duration being 3 hours. The race was won by Luigi Villoresi in a Ferrari 500. Peter Collins was second in an HWM-Alta and Johnny Claes third in a Simca Gordini Type 15. Alberto Ascari started from pole in a Ferrari 500 and set fastest lap but crashed and retired.

Results

References

Sables
Sables
Sables